In regression, mean response (or expected response) and predicted response, also known as mean outcome (or expected outcome) and predicted outcome, are values of the dependent variable calculated from the regression parameters and a given value of the independent variable. The values of these two responses are the same, but their calculated variances are different.
The concept is a generalization of the distinction between the standard error of the mean and the sample standard deviation.

Background 

In straight line fitting, the model is

The mean, and predicted, response value for a given explanatory value, xd, is given by

while the actual response would be

Variance of the mean response 
The variance of the mean response is given by

 

This expression can be simplified to

where m is the number of data points.

To demonstrate this simplification, one can make use of the identity

Variance of the predicted response 
The predicted response distribution is the predicted distribution of the residuals at the given point xd. So the variance is given by

 

The second line follows from the fact that  is zero because the new prediction point is independent of the data used to fit the model. Additionally, the term  was calculated earlier for the mean response. 

Since  (a fixed but unknown parameter that can be estimated), the variance of the predicted response is given by

Confidence intervals 

Thus, the confidence interval for predicted response is wider than the interval for mean response.

This is analogous to the difference between the variance of a population and the variance of the sample mean of a population: the variance of a population is a parameter and does not change, but the variance of the sample mean decreases with increased samples.

General linear regression 
The general linear model can be written as

 

Therefore, since  the general expression for the variance of the mean response is

 

where S is the covariance matrix of the parameters, given by

See also
Expected value
Prediction error
Regression prediction

References 

 

Regression analysis